Ōtō may refer to:

 Ōtō, Fukuoka
 Ōtō, Nara
 Ōtō, Wakayama
 Keihan Ōtō Line